Chasbaz-e Kusha (also Romanized as Chāsbaz-e Kūshā) is a village in Kuh Shah Rural District, Ahmadi District, Hajjiabad County, Hormozgan Province, Iran. At the 2006 census, its population was 65, in 13 families.

References 

Populated places in Hajjiabad County